was a Japanese actor. He appeared in over 200 films, including Akira Kurosawa's Seven Samurai, Rashomon, Yojimbo, and Ikiru. He also worked repeatedly for noted directors such as Yasujirō Ozu, Mikio Naruse and Kenji Mizoguchi.

Career
Born as Tokunosuke Katō to a theatrical family, his older brother was the actor Kunitarō Sawamura and his older sister the actress Sadako Sawamura. He joined the Zenshinza Theatre Company in 1933 and appeared in a number of stage and film productions under the stage name Enji Ichikawa, including Sadao Yamanaka's Humanity and Paper Balloons and Kenji Mizoguchi's The 47 Ronin. After spending the war in New Guinea, he returned to Japan and signed with the Daiei Film studio, appearing now under the name Daisuke Katō. 

In addition to appearing in traditional jidaigeki roles, notably as one of Kurosawa's Seven Samurai, Katō became a popular everyman in contemporary shōshimin-eiga movies. His transfer to Toho in 1951 was an astute career choice, as he emerged as one of their most prolific performers; by the late 1950's he was headlining minor films and co-starring in major ones, including their Company President (Shachō) comedies. Toho leveraged Katō's cherubic appeal, featuring him heavily in promotional materials, and his celebrity grew beyond the typical status of a supporting player. 

His 1961 book about his wartime experiences, Minami no shima ni yuki ga furu (Snow in the South Seas), was adapted by Toho as a showcase for Katō, who was top-billed, paired with major studio comic actor Junzaburō Ban (who received the only other solo screen credit), and supported with guest appearances by A-list Toho stars Hisaya Morishige, Tatsuya Mihashi, Keiju Kobayashi, and Frankie Sakai. The book later became an NHK television drama, a stage play, and a second film.

Honors
Daisuke Katō won the Blue Ribbon Award and Mainichi Film Concours for Best Supporting Actor in 1952 for Kettō Kagiya no Tsuji and Mother, and the Blue Ribbon Award in 1954 for Bloody Spear at Mount Fuji and Koko ni izumi ari.

On June 7, 1963, Katō was the subject of the Asahi Shimbun Interview, a distinction reserved for notable members of the arts, sports, political, and business communities.

In 2008, Katō was one of the actors commemorated in the Seven Supporting Characters film festival held at the now-defunct Cinema Artone in Tokyo's Shimokitazawa entertainment district.

Family
Kato's nephews are the actors Masahiko Tsugawa and Hiroyuki Nagato. His son, Haruyuki Katō, married Kazuko Kurosawa, the costume designer and daughter of Akira Kurosawa. His grandson by Harayuki and Kazuko is actor Takayuki Kato.

Selected filmography

 Kōchiyama Sōshun (河内山宗俊) (1936) - Kenta
 Humanity and Paper Balloons (人情紙風船 Ninjō kami fūsen) (1937) - Isuke - Yatagoro henchman
 Abe ichizoku (1938)
 The 47 Ronin (元禄忠臣蔵 Genroku chushingura) (1941) - Fuwa Kazuemon (uncredited)
 Bosu (1949)
 Bangaku Edo e yuku (1949)
 Saheiji torimonohikae: Murasaki zukin (1949) - Yasu
 Saheiji torimonohikae: Murasaki zukin - Kaiketsu-hen (1949) - Yasu
 Shinshaku Yotsuya kaidan: kōhen (1949) - Shinkichi
 Onna koroshi abura jigoku (1949)
 Tengu hikyaku (1949)
 Nippon G Men: Dai-ni-wa - Nansenzaki no kettō (1950)
 Ore wa yojinbo (1950)
 Harukanari haha no kuni (1950) - Tommy Shōkyokusai
 Rashomon (羅生門 Rashōmon) (1950) - Policeman
 Akagi Kara kita otoko (1950)
 Gorotsuki-bune (1950) - Sōkichi
 Oboro kago (1951)
 Tsuki no wataridori (1951) - Matagorō
 Jiyū gakkō (1951) - Takayama
 Joshu Garasu (1951)
 Mesu inu (1951) - Matoba
 Vendetta for a Samurai (1952) - Rokusuke
 The Life of Oharu (1952) - Tasaburo Hishiya
 Zoku Shurajō hibun - Hiun no maki (1952) - Inosuke
 Mother (おかあさん Okāsan) (1952) - Uncle Kimura
 Yonjū-hachinin me no otoko (1952)
 Shanhai no onna (1952) - Liu, Ding's men
 Ikiru (1952) - Yakuza
 Ashi ni sawatta onna (1952)
 Fuun senryobune (1952)
 Jinsei gekijo: dai ichi bu/dai ni bu (1952)
 Edokko hangan (1953)
 Pu-san (1953)
 Yasugorō shusse (1953)
 Aoiro kakumei (1953) - Takegoro Inugai
 Jirochō sangokushi: hatsu iwai Shimizu Minato (1953)
 Kaiketsu Murasaki-zukin: Sōshūban (1953)
 Jirochō sangokushi: seizoroi Shimizu Minato (1953)
 Yonin no haha (1954)
 Seven Samurai (七人の侍 Shichinin no Samurai) (1954) - Shichirōji
 Shiosai (1954) - Chiyoko's Father, the lighthouse keeper
 Watashi no subete o (1954)
 Late Chrysanthemums (1954) - Itaya
 Toran būran: Tsuki no hikari (1954) - Private Sasaki
 Dorodarake no seishun (1954) - Miyamori, publicity manager
 Samurai I: Musashi Miyamoto (1954) - Toji
 Tarao bannai hayabusa no maō (1955)
 Floating Clouds (1955) - Seikichi Mukai
 Koko ni izumi ari (1955)
 Bloody Spear at Mount Fuji (血槍富士 Chiyari Fuji) (1955) - Genta
 No Time for Tears (1955) - Magazine reporter
 Tōjūrō no Koi (藤十郎の恋) (1955) - Kichisuke
 Tasogare sakaba (1955) - Kibe
 Samurai II: Duel at Ichijoji Temple (続宮本武蔵 一乗寺の決闘 Zoku Miyamoto Musashi: Ichijōji no kettō) (1955) - Tōji Gion
 The Lone Journey (旅路 Tabiji) aka The Road (1955)
 Mune yori mune ni (1955) - Hazama
 Samurai III: Duel at Ganryu Island (1956) - Toji Gion
 Sudden Rain (1956) - Kawakami
 Early Spring (1956) - Sakamoto
 Izumi (1956)
 Kengō nitōryū (1956) - Kamo Jinnai
 Street of Shame (赤線地帯 Akasen chitai) (1956) - president of Brothel Owners' Association
 Tsuma no kokoro (1956)
 Shiroi magyo (1956)
 Gendai no yokubō (1956) - Inoue
 Onibi (1956)
 Ani to sono musume (1956) - Hayashi
 Arashi (1956) - Ishii
 Gogo 8 ji 13 pun (1956) - Keisaku Yatabe
 Flowing (1956) - Yoneko's ex
 Itohan monogatari (1957) - Matsukichi
 Ôban (1957) - Ushinosuke Akaba
 Wasureji no gogo 8 ji 13 pun (1957) - Police Detective Yatabe
 Snow Country (1957)
 Untamed (1957) - Her second husband
 Salaryman shusse taikōki (1957) - Hajime Sōda
 Zoku Ôban: Fūun hen (1957) - Ushinosuke Akaba
 Ippon-gatana dohyō iri (1957) - Mohei Komagata
 Zoku sarariman shussetai kōki (1957)
 Zokuzoku Ôban: Dotō hen (1957) - Ushinotsuke Akabane
 Shachō sandaiki (1958)
 Futari dake no hashi (1958) - Takeshi Saitō
 Zoku shachō sandaiki (1958)
 A Holiday in Tokyo (1958) - Sales Manager
 Yajikata dōchū sugoroku (1958) - Yajirobei Tochimen'ya
 Anzukko (1958) - Suga
 Oban kanketsu hen (1958)
 Shu to midori (1958)
 Summer Clouds (1958)
 Zokuzoku sarariman shussetai kōki (1958)
 Wakai musumetachi (1958) - Zenkichi Shibata - Sumiko's father
 Kami no taisho (1958)
 Hadaka no taishō (1958) - Master of Restaurant
 Yajikita dōchū sugoroku (1958) - Yajirobei Tochimen'ya
 Shachō taiheiki (1959) - Gōnosuke Asahina
 Zoku shachō taiheiki (1959)
 Kitsune to tanuki (1959)
 Sarariman shussetai koki daiyonbu (1959) - Hajime
 Daigaku no nijuhachin (1959)
 Moro no Ichimatsu yūrei dochu (1959)
 Shin santō jūyaku (1959) - Kumehei Onizuka
 Uwayaku, shitayaku, godōyaku (1959)
 Wakai koibitotachi (1959) - Renzō Dōjima
 The Three Treasures (1959) - God Fudetama
 Osorubeki hiasobi (1959)
 Yari hitosuji nihon bare (1959) - Genshin Tawaraboshi
 Watashi wa kai ni naritai (1959)
 Kiri aru jyoji (1959)
 Shiranami gonin otoko: tenka no ō-dorobō (1960)
 Shin santō jūyaku: Tabi to onna to sake no maki (1960)
 Yama no kanata ni - Dai ichi-bu: Ringo no hoo: Dai ni-bu: Sakana no seppun (1960) - Yakichi Wada
 Hito mo arukeba (1960) - Namigoro Namiki
 Sarariman shussetai kōki daigobu (1960) - Hajime
 Kunisada Chūji (1960) - Enzo Niko
 Hawai Middowei daikaikūsen: Taiheiyō no arashi (1960)
 Shin santō jūyaku: Ataru mo hakke no maki (1960) - Uchū Takeda
 Musume tsuma haha (1960) - Shusuke Tetsumoto
 Taiyō o dake (1960) - Kyōsuke Tsumura
 Shin santo juyaku: teishu kyo iku no maki (1960)
 Shin jōdaigaku (1960)
 Gametsui yatsu (1960)
 Aki tachinu (1960) - Tomioka - The Lover
 Kane-dukuri taikō-ki (1960) - Hirayama, Shūhei
 When a Woman Ascends the Stairs (1960) - Matsukichi Sekine
 Jiyūgaoka fujin (1960)
 Zoku sararîman Chūshingura (1961) - Jyusaburo Onodera
 Yojimbo (用心棒 Yōjinbō) (1961) - Inokichi - Ushitora's Rotund Brother
 Zoku shachō dochuki: onna oyabun taiketsu no maki (1961)
 Shachō dōchūki (1961)
 Honkon no yoru (1961)
 The End of Summer (1961) - Kitagawa Yanosuke
 Ganba (1961)
 Kigeki ekimae bentō (1961)
 Salary man Shimizu minato (1962) - Ômasa
 Onna no za (1962) - Tamura Ryokichi, Matsuyo no otto
 Zoku sararîman shimizu minato (1962)
 Ika naru hoshi no moto ni (1962) - Sōtarō
 Shachō yōkōki (1962)
 Zoku shachō yōkōki (1962)
 Ottamage ningyo monogatari (1962) - Heiroku Tsubaki
 Star of Hong Kong (1962) - Shūhei
 Shin kitsune to tanuki (1962)
 Hōrō-ki (1962) - Nobuo Sadaoka
 Chūshingura (1962) - Kichiemon Terasaka
 An Autumn Afternoon (1962) - Yoshitarō Sakamoto
 Kawa no hotori de (1962) - Kenkichi Takayama
 Kigeki: Detatoko shōbu - 'Chinjarara monogatari' yori (1962) - Nishiyama
 Shachō manyūki (1963)
 Onna ni tsuyoku naru kufū no kazukazu (1963) - Daizō Sugishita
 Zoku shachō manyūki (1963)
 Shachō gaiyūki (1963)
 Kureji sakusen: Sentehisshō (1963)
 Kigeki: Tonkatsu ichidai (1963) - Denji Tamaki
 Minami no shima ni yuki ga furu (1963)
 Zoku shachō gaiyūki (1963)
 Kigeki ekimae chagama (1963)
 Miren (1963) - Master at 'Sekine'
 Onna no rekishi (1963)
 Warera sarariman (1963)
 Shachō shinshiroku (1964)
 Kigeki ekimae okami (1964) - Rikizō Kawaguchi
 Zoku shachō shinshiroku (1964)
 Ore wa bodigado (1964)
 Samé (1964) - Genji
 Hadaka no jūyaku (1964) - Tadokori - Executive
 Nippon paradaisu (1964) - Daiten Kuramoto
 Kuro no chōtokkyu (1964) - Nakae
 Danchi: Nanatsu no taizai (1964) - Ichirō Mitani
 Shachō ninpōchō (1965)
 Zoku shachō ninpōchō (1965) - Tyuzo Togashi
 Hi no ataru isu (1965) - Natsuki Shibusawa
 Radishes and Carrots (1965) - Bit Part
 Sanshiro Sugata (1965) - Hansuke Murai
 Senjo ni nagareru uta (1965) - Yamamoto
 Aku no kaidan (1965) - Konishi
 Shachō gyōjōki (1966)
 Abare Gōemon (1966) - Budeuemon Hattori
 The Stranger Within a Woman (1966)
 Zoku shachō gyōjōki (1966) - Tyuzo Togashi
 Hikinige (1966) - Kawashima
 Nakano Spy School (1966) - Lieutenant Kusanagi
 Rikugun Nakano gakko: Kumoichigō shirei (1966) - Kusanagi
 The Daphne (1966) - Shimada
 Akogare (1966)
 Shachō senichiya (1967)
 Rikugun Nakano gakko: Ryu-sango shirei (1967)
 Mesu ga osu o kuikorosu: Kamakiri (1967) - Gunpei Otaguro
 Zoku izuko e (1967)
 Zoku namonaku mazushiku utsukushiku: Haha to ko (1967) - Taro
 Chichi to ko: Zoku Na mo naku mazushiku utsukushiku (1967) - Shintaro Sakai
 Zoku shachō senichiya (1967)
 Rikugun Nakano gakko: Mitsumei (1967)
 Japan's Longest Day (1967) - Kenjiro Yabe - NHK Domestic Bureau Director
 Kigeki: Ippatsu shōbu (1967) - Tadashi Ninomiya
 Scattered Clouds (1967) - Hayashida
 Nise keiji (1967)
 Shachō hanjōki (1968)
 Zoku shacho hanjōki (1968)
 Rikugun Nakano gakkō: Kaisen zen'ya (1968)
 Bakuchi-uchi: Nagurikomi (1968) - Kichigorō
 Niji no naka no remon (1968) - Gōzō Maeda
 Rengō kantai shirei chōkan: Yamamoto Isoroku (1968) - Chief of Press Section
 Kōdōkan hamonjō (1968) - Junpei Sekine
 Shachō enmachō (1969)
 Zoku shachō enmachō (1969)
 Shachō gaku ABC (1970)
 Zoku shachō gaku ABC (1970)
 Futari dake no asa (1971)
 Showa hito keta shachō tai futaketa shain (1971)
 Zoku Showa hito keta shachō tai futaketa shain: Getsu-getsu kasui moku kinkin (1971)
 Hajimete no tabi (1972)
 Tokyo do mannaka (1974)

References

External links

 
 
 

1911 births
1975 deaths
Male actors from Tokyo
Japanese male film actors
20th-century Japanese male actors
Japanese male stage actors